Powelltown is a town in Victoria, Australia, 70 km east of Melbourne's central business district, located within the Shire of Yarra Ranges local government area. Powelltown recorded a population of 214 at the 2021 census.

History
The first settlement was established in 1901 when H Blake founded the first timber mill known as Blake's Mill; later a larger mill was constructed and completed in 1913 by the Victorian Powell Wood Processing Company to harvest hardwood mountain ash in the Little Yarra Valley to fill its new government contracts. The logs were transported from the forests to the sawmills by tramway and from there to the railheads at Yarra Junction and Warburton. Renowned axemen like Shane Corr opened up the veins of timber with no more than an axe and a team of bullocks to fulfil his government contracts. The Post Office opened around 1904, as Blake's, and the settlement was renamed Powelltown in 1912.

The Powelltown Tramway provided a passenger and goods service to Yarra Junction between 1913 and 1945.

Today, many of the trails constructed to transport timber have been opened up as walking trails and driving routes for tourists, including the Powelltown Tramway Rail Trail.

Sport
The town has an Australian Rules football team competing in the Yarra Valley Mountain District Football League. Despite its small population, Powelltown has produced a number of AFL former players including, Melbourne Demons forward Sean Charles and Western Bulldogs and Fremantle forward Daniel Hargraves. A relative of Charles, former West Coast Eagles defender David Wirrpanda also played junior football with the Powelltown Demons.

The town also has a cricket club that plays in the Ringwood and District Cricket Association.It features 2 senior teams that compete in the D.J Strachan Shield and the Adrian Hammond Shield.

References

  (151 pages)

External links

 Powelltown (SMH Travel)

Towns in Victoria (Australia)
Yarra Valley
Yarra Ranges